The Roman Catholic Archdiocese of Bourges (Latin: Archidioecesis Bituricensis; French: Archidiocèse de Bourges) is an archdiocese of the Latin Church of the Roman Catholic Church in France. The Archdiocese comprises the departements of Cher and Indre in the Region of Val de Loire. Bourges Cathedral stands in the city of Bourges in the department of Cher.  Although this is still titled as an Archdiocese, it ceased as a metropolitan see in 2002 and is now a suffragan in the ecclesiastical province of Tours.

In 2002 it lost its metropolitan function (and thus the archbishop no longer wears the pallium), its province having ceased to exist (the province had already been substantially modified from the late Roman province of Aquitania Prima with which it had initially corresponded - Albi had been erected as an archbishopric in the medieval context of heresiological conflict; Orléans, Chartres, and Blois - historically dependent on Sens - had been attached to Paris, from which they passed to Bourges in the 1960s). The Archdiocese (also the three above- mentioned sees) is now suffragan to the Archdiocese of Tours; other dioceses until recently dependent on Bourges are now suffragans of the Clermont-Ferrand Archdiocese. Historical ecclesiastical geography has here thus changed to correspond with France's new regions, much as diocesan and provincial boundaries from Napoleon's Concordat of 1801 onwards changed mainly in accordance with those of the Revolution's départements.

History 

The diocese was founded in the 3rd century. Its first bishop was St. Ursinus of Bourges. In the Middle Ages there was a dispute between the bishop of Bourges and the bishop of Bordeaux about the primacy of Aquitaine. Bourges was the place of many synods. The synods 1225 and 1226 are the most important and dealt with the Albigenses.

Bishops of Bourges

To 600
 St. Ursinus of Bourges (3rd century)
 Sevitianus
 Aetherius
 Thecretus
 Marcellus (all prior to 337)
 Saint Viateur (Viator) 337–354 
 : Leothère 354–363 
  : Pauper 363–377
 Palladius (377–384)
  : Villice 384–412
  : Avit 412–431
  : Saint Pallais II 448–462
 Leo (453)
 Euloge 462–469
 Simplicius (472–480)
 Saint Tétrade 494–506
 Rorice 512–?
 ?–? : Siagre
 ?–? : Saint Humat : ?–?
 Honoratus of Bourges (pres. Council of Clermont (535)) 533–535
 Saint Honoré II 535–537
 Saint Arcade 537–549 
 Saint Désiré (549–552)
 Saint Probien 552–559 
 Saint Félix 560–573
 Remedius (all in the second half of the sixth century)
 Sulpitius I of Bourges (584–591)
 Saint Eustase 591–591
 Saint Apollinaire 591 – † 5 octobre 611

From 600 to 1000
 
 Austregisilus (612–624)
 Sulpicius II. of Bourges (624–644)
 Saint Florent (647–660)
 Adon (662–680)
 Agosène (682–683)
 Roch (696–736)
 Sigin (736–761)
 Landoaire (761–764)
 Dédoat (764–780)
 Ségolène (780–785)
 David (793–802)
 Bertholan (815–827)
 Agilulfus (c. 829–840)
 Raoul of Turenne (840–866)
 Wulfad (866–876)
 Frotharius (876–c. 893)
 Adace (890–900)
 Madalbert (900–910)
 Saint Géronce de Déols (910–948)
 Laune de Déols (948–955)
 Richard de Blois (955–969)
 Hugh of Blois (969–985)
 Dagbert (987–1013)

From 1000 to 1300

 Gauzlin Capet (1013–1030)
...
 Alberich of Reims (1136–1141)
 Henry de Sully (d. 1200)
 William of Donjeon (1200–09)
 Girard de Cros 1209–1218
 Simon de Sully 1218–1232
 Philippe Berruyer 1232–1260
 Jean de Sully 1260–1271
 Guy de Sully 1276–1280
 Simon de Beaulieu 1281–1294
 Gilles de Rome 1295–1316

1300 to 1600

 Renault de la Porte 1316–1320
 Guillaume de Brosse 1321–1331
 Foucaud de Rochechouard 1331–1343
 Blessed Roger le Fort 1343–1367
 Pierre d'Estaing 1367–1370
 Pierre de Cros 1370–1374, became Archbishop of Arles, and cardinal
 Bertrand de Chenac 1374–1386
 Jean de Rochechouart 1382–1390
 Pierre Aimery 1391–1409
 Guillaume de Boisratier 1409–1421
 Henry d'Avangour 1421–1446
 Jean Coeur 1446–1483
 Pierre Cadoüet 1483–1492
 Guillaume de Cambray 1492–1505
 Michel de Bucy 1505–1511
 Andrew Forman 1513
 François de Tournon 1526-1537 (elevated to Cardinal in 1530)
 Renaud de Beaune 1581

1600 to present

 André Fremiot, 1602–1621
 Michel Phélypeaux de La Vrillière, 1677–1694
 Georges-Louis Phélypeaux d'Herbault, 1757–1787
 Jean-Antoine-Auguste de Chastenet de Puységur (1788–1802)
 Marie-Charles-Isidore de Mercy (1802–1811)
 Étienne-Jean-Baptiste-Louis des Gallois de La Tour (1817–1820)
 Jean-Marie Cliquet de Fontenay (1820–1834)
 Guillaume-Aubin de Villèle (1825–1841)
 Jacques-Marie-Antoine-Célestin du Pont (1842–1859)
 Alexis-Basile-Alexandre Menjaud (1859–1861)
 Charles-Amable de la Tour d'Auvergne Lauraguais (1861–1879)
 Jean-Joseph Marchal (1880–1892)

 Jean-Pierre Boyer (1893–1896)
 Pierre-Paul Servonnet (1897–1909)
 Louis-Ernest Dubois (1909–1916), appointed Archbishop of Rouen (Cardinal later that year)
 Martin-Jérôme Izart (1916–1934)
 Louis-Joseph Fillon (1934–1943)
 Joseph-Charles Lefèbvre (1943–1969) (Cardinal in 1960)
 Charles-Marie-Paul Vignancour (1969–1984)
 Pierre Marie Léon Augustin Plateau (1984–2000)
 Hubert Barbier (2000–2007)
 Armand Maillard (2007–2018)
 Jérôme Daniel Beau (25 July 2018– )

See also
 Catholic Church in France
 Timeline of Bourges

References

Bibliography

Reference works
  (Use with caution; obsolete)
  (in Latin) 
 (in Latin)

Studies

External links
  Centre national des Archives de l'Église de France, L'Épiscopat francais depuis 1919, retrieved: 2016-12-24.
 Archevêques de Bourges 
 Lists of Bishops and Archbishops

 
Roman Catholic dioceses in France
Dioceses established in the 3rd century
3rd-century establishments in Roman Gaul